Claes Göran Månsson (born 5 February 1950) is a Swedish actor, comedian, writer and film director, most famous for his work on Lorry. Månsson also co-starred on the Swedish sitcom Welcome to Sweden and is known for dubbing the voice of Wallace in the Swedish-language versions of the British stop-motion Wallace & Gromit films (except for Wallace and Gromit: The Curse Of The Were-Rabbit).

Filmography
1989 - A Grand Day Out (voice; Swedish dub)
1989 - 1939 (1989)
1991 - Charlie Strapp and Froggy Ball Flying High (voice)
1993 - The Wrong Trousers (voice; Swedish dub)
1995 - A Close Shave (voice; Swedish dub)
1996 - Lilla Jönssonligan och cornflakeskuppen
1997 - Peter-No-Tail
2002 - Olivia Twist
2006 - Barnyard (voice; Swedish dub)
2008 - A Matter Of Loaf And Death (voice; Swedish dub)
2011 - The Stig-Helmer Story
2014 - Welcome to Sweden

External links

Swedish male film actors
Swedish male television actors
Swedish male voice actors
Swedish comedians
Swedish film directors
Sommar (radio program) hosts
Living people
1950 births
Best Supporting Actor Guldbagge Award winners
20th-century Swedish male actors
21st-century Swedish male actors